The  Real Fabrica de Tabacos Partagás is a cigar factory museum in Havana, Cuba. The world-famous habanos cigars are produced in this factory. Across the street from the massive Capitol building in Havana, is one of Cuba's oldest cigar factories. The Real Fabrica de Tabacos Partagas is housed in a well-preserved industrial building dating from 1845. The building stands out amongst its neighbours because of the ornate colorful maroon and cream exterior. Real Fabrica de Tabacos Partagas was started by Jaime Partagas but foundered after his mysterious death. Ramon Cifuentes took over and the business grew under his stewardship.

External links 

 Partagas Factory & Cigar Sign Video
 Partagas Celebrates 150 Years at the Same Address

Buildings and structures in Havana
Economy of Havana